Makoda (or Makuda) is a local government area in Kano State, Nigeria. Its headquarters are in the town of Koguna. It was carved out of Danbatta local government area.

It has an area of 441 km and had a population of 222,399 at the 2006 census.

The postal code of the area is 702.

References

Local Government Areas in Kano State